Nazarethpettai is a village approximately 10 kilometers north of Chennai. It is the birthplace of former Chief Minister of Madras Presidency and leader of the Indian National Congress Minjur Bhaktavatsalam.

Suburbs of Chennai